The Song Remains Insane is the first video album by the American metal band Soulfly. It was released through Roadrunner Records on March 1, 2005.

Track listing 
All songs written and composed by Max Cavalera.

Live
 "Prophecy"
 "Eye for an Eye"
 "Living Sacrifice"
 "Bring It"
 "Refuse/Resist"
 "Execution Style"
 "Seek 'n' Strike"
 "Roots Bloody Roots"
Music videos
 "Bleed"
 "Back to the Primitive"
 "Seek 'n' Strike"
 "Prophecy"
Bonus performance clips
 "Attitude"
 "First Commandment"
 "No Hope = No Fear"
Bonus audio track
 "Blow Away"

Personnel 
 Villains – producer
 Kimo Proudfoot – director
 Jason Cohon – producer
 Janet Haase – executive producer
 Chris Wright – editor

Soulfly albums
2005 video albums
2005 live albums
Live video albums
Roadrunner Records live albums
Roadrunner Records video albums